is a Japanese former professional baseball player. He played as a catcher in Major League Baseball for four years with the Seattle Mariners in the American League, then returned to Japan and played for the Hanshin Tigers.

On November 21, 2005, Johjima and the Mariners agreed to a $16.5 million, three-year contract. Johjima also played in the 2004 Summer Olympics in Athens for Japan. On October 19, 2009, Johjima opted out of the final two years of a three-year extension that he had signed with the Mariners in 2008 with the intention to return to playing in Japan.

Professional career

Fukuoka Daiei Hawks/Fukuoka SoftBank Hawks
Johjima was named to the Pacific League's "Best Nine" for the first time as the Fukuoka Daiei Hawks won the Japan Series and the Pacific League championship. He hit .306 with 33 double and 17 home runs, third in the league in batting average behind Ichiro Suzuki and Kazuo Matsui. He ranked third in doubles and won his first Golden Glove.

He batted .310 in 2000, again earning "Best Nine" honors. He was also named an All-Star while winning another Gold Glove, while stealing a career-best 10 bases.

In 2001, Johjima hit 31 home runs and collected 95 RBI, and was again named to "Best Nine." He was selected to All-Star team and won his third consecutive Gold Glove. He played a career-high 140 games.

In 2002 Johjima won his fourth consecutive Gold Glove while batting .293.

In 2003, he helped lead the Hawks to another Pacific League championship and was named Pacific League's Most Valuable Player. He batted .330 and hit 34 home runs and posted career highs of 101 runs, 182 hits, 39 doubles, 119 RBI, 53 walks, .655 slugging percentage and .432 on-base percentage. Kenji tied his career high of 140 games played while winning his fifth straight Gold Glove, made his fourth "Best Nine" and sixth All-Star squad. He led the Pacific League in total bases, second in hits, RBI, doubles and third in home runs and runs.

He missed part of the 2004 Japan League season while playing in the Olympics but still managed career-highs of .338 and 36 home runs. Johjima was hit by a pitch 22 times, breaking Ichiro's previous Pacific League mark of 18. He homered, doubled twice and had four RBI to lead Japan to 11-2 win over Canada for the bronze medal. He ranked fifth among Olympians with a .378 batting average and seventh with seven runs scored.

A seven-time All-Star for the Hawks, Johjima became a free agent after hitting .309 with 24 home runs and 57 RBI in 116 games, during the 2005 season, which was cut short by two injuries, including a broken leg.

From  through 2005, Johjima hit .299 with 211 home runs and 699 RBI in 1,117 games.

As a catcher, Johjima had 6,321 outs with 572 assists and 48 errors in 6,941 chances for a .993 fielding average.  He posted a .376 caught stealing percentage (222-for-591).

Seattle Mariners

On November 21, 2005, Johjima and the Seattle Mariners agreed to a $16.5 million, three-year contract.

Johjima became the first Japanese player to catch full-time in the major leagues.

On April 3, 2006, Johjima and Ichiro Suzuki became the first pair of Japanese position players to take the field in an MLB starting lineup.

Johjima hit a home run in each of his first two Major League games against the Los Angeles Angels of Anaheim on April 3 and April 4,  in Seattle. He was the first catcher since Jerry Moore in 1884 to hit a home run in his first Major League game.

In , his first season with the Mariners, Johjima hit .291 with 18 home runs and 76 RBIs in 144 games. His 18 home runs matched the franchise record for catchers. Johjima hit .322 in August and .295 during the second half of the season. He hit two home runs and drove in a career-best five runs on June 27 against the Arizona Diamondbacks.

In his rookie season he set the record for most hits by a rookie catcher, with 147. The previous record was 146.

Johjima led the AL in times reached on an error (13), ranked 5th in AL in hit-by-pitch, 11, and 6th in GIDP, 22. His 11 hit-by-pitches was tied for 5th-most in Mariners history. Among AL catchers, ranked 3rd in hits, 4th in average, doubles and RBI and 5th i..from May 1 to the end of the season caught 30 of 68 (44%). Kenji hit his first career grand slam May 26 against the Kansas City Royals off of Brian Bannister; he also hit grand slam July 14 against the Detroit Tigers.

In  Kenji started 95 games at catcher, and has caught 3112.2 innings in the past three seasons, 5th-most in the majors. He threw out 18 of 69 attempted base stealers. Johjima stole home May 31, his first career steal of home, only second steal since start of 2007.

On April 25, 2008, the Mariners and Johjima agreed to a three-year contract extension. However, after losing playing time to two other catchers in the 2009 season, Johjima opted out of the final two years of this extension so he could return to playing in Japan, where he signed with the Hanshin Tigers of Japan's Central League. He retired a month into the 2012 season.

Career statistics

NPB

MLB American League

Personal life
 Johjima resides in Sasebo, Japan with his wife Maki and his son Yuta and daughter Miu
 He often called himself "George Mackenzie" as opposed to "Johjima Kenji", especially before he played in MLB

References

External links

 Johjima Kenji Baseball Memorial Hall Official Site
Japanese Baseball Page
Japanese league stats and info of Kenji Johjima

1976 births
2009 World Baseball Classic players
Baseball players at the 2004 Summer Olympics
Fukuoka Daiei Hawks players
Fukuoka SoftBank Hawks players
Hanshin Tigers players
Japanese expatriate baseball players in the United States
Living people
Major League Baseball catchers
Major League Baseball players from Japan
Medalists at the 2004 Summer Olympics
Nippon Professional Baseball catchers
Nippon Professional Baseball MVP Award winners
Olympic baseball players of Japan
Olympic bronze medalists for Japan
Olympic medalists in baseball
People from Sasebo
Baseball people from Nagasaki Prefecture
Seattle Mariners players
Tacoma Rainiers players